France has a rich selection of Gold and Silver commemorative coins.  These coins are minted by Monnaie de Paris, which is a state owned industrial and commercial company.

2002

Notes

References

 

France
Coins of France
2002 in France